Keith Schaefer (20 December 1928 – 21 August 1976) was an Australian rules footballer who played with South Melbourne in the Victorian Football League (VFL).

Schaefer played 102 games for South Melbourne, between 1947 and 1953. A centreman, Schaefer was a Victorian interstate representative in 1948, at the age of just 19. He won South Melbourne's best and fairest award in 1952.

At the end of the 1953 VFL season, Scheafer left South Melbourne to be playing coach of Deniliquin.

In 1955, Schaefer was captain-coach of Traralgon.

He died in 1976 after losing his battle with bowel cancer.

References

External links
 
 

1928 births
1976 deaths
Australian rules footballers from Melbourne
Sydney Swans players
Bob Skilton Medal winners
Deniliquin Football Club players
Traralgon Football Club players
Traralgon Football Club coaches
Deaths from colorectal cancer
Deaths from cancer in Australia